Genesis Foundation may refer to:

Genesis Foundation (arts charity), an arts charity in the UK
Genesis Foundation (Colombia), an education charity in Colombia